Lakeside School District 9  is a school district in Garland County, Arkansas.

It includes Lake Hamilton and a section of Hot Springs.

Staff Qualifications 
All professional personnel employed by the Lakeside School District must possess those  qualifications set forth by the State Department of Education and/or the North Central Association of Colleges and Schools. 

All instructional personnel must maintain on file, in the Superintendent's office, the following information:

 Signed Contract 
 Arkansas Teacher Certificate 
 Social Security Number 
 T.B. Certificate 
 Statement of number of dependents 
 Official transcript of all college work 
 Current address and telephone number 
 Completed Employment Eligibility from

High School Course Catalog (2020 - 2021)

Graduation Requirements (Smart Core) 
All students must successfully complete the following 24 credit requirements to be eligible for Graduation

References

External links

School districts in Arkansas
Education in Garland County, Arkansas
Hot Springs, Arkansas